Barry Frank Dunning (born 17 March 1946) is a British sailor who competed in the 1972 Summer Olympics and in the 1976 Summer Olympics.

References

1946 births
Living people
British male sailors (sport)
Olympic sailors of Great Britain
Sailors at the 1972 Summer Olympics – Soling
Sailors at the 1976 Summer Olympics – Soling
People from Brentford
Sportspeople from London